This is an overview of the top finalists of the Miss Earth competition.

Miss Earth elemental queens 
Miss Earth uses specific titles and crowns for the runners-up, based upon the four elements of antiquity, calling the 1st runner-up Miss Air, the 2nd runner-up Miss Water, and the 3rd runner-up Miss Fire. To distinguish the runners-up at the international competition from those at the national level, the international edition includes the title "Miss Earth" before the names of each element; for example, "Miss Earth – Air."

Table notes:

Miss Air 
Countries by number of wins

Miss Air is the second-place finisher. The current Miss Air 2022 is Sheridan Mortlock from Australia.

Continents by number of wins

Assumed wins

Titles assumed following resignations.

Up position change

Resigned wins

Miss Water 
Countries by number of wins

Miss Water is the third-place finisher. The current Miss Water 2022 is Nadeen Ayoub from Palestine.

Continentes by number of wins
Assumed wins

Up position change

Resigned wins

Miss Fire 
Countries by number of wins

Miss Fire is the fourth-place finisher. The current Miss Fire 2022 is Andrea Aguilera from Colombia.

Continentes by number of wins
Assumed wins

Up position change

Resigned wins

Notes for the previous three tables:

See also
 List of Miss International runners-up and finalists
 List of Miss Universe runners-up and finalists
 List of Miss World runners-up and finalists
 Big Four international beauty pageants

References

External links

Miss Earth Foundation website

Miss Earth
Miss Earth titleholders
Miss Earth titleholders